Mauga Afi ("Burning Mountain" or "Mountain of Fire") is a volcanic mountain in the Gagaʻifomauga district on the island of Savai'i in Samoa. It has an elevation of 1847m.

The most recent eruption of Mauga Afi was around 1768 and was observed by Louis Antoine de Bougainville when sailing past Savai'i. Lava from this eruption sequence covered vast areas of the north coast of Savai'i.

References

External links

Mountains of Samoa
Volcanoes of Samoa
Savai'i